Robert Tyrrell may refer to:
Robert Yelverton Tyrrell (1844–1914), Irish classical scholar
Bob Tyrrell (tattoo artist) (born 1962), American tattoo artist
Emmett Tyrrell or Bob Tyrell (born 1943), editor, author, and columnist
Ken Tyrrell or Robert Kenneth Tyrrell (1924–2001), British Formula Two racing driver